5-Methoxy-6-methyl-2-aminoindane (MMAI) is a drug developed in the 1990s by a team led by David E. Nichols at Purdue University. It acts as a non-neurotoxic and highly selective serotonin releasing agent (SSRA) and produces entactogen effects in humans. It has been sold as a designer drug and research chemical online since 2010.

MMAI has been shown to relieve stress-induced depression in rats more robustly than sertraline, and as a result it has been suggested that SSRAs like MMAI and 4-MTA could be developed as novel antidepressants with a faster onset of therapeutic action and superior efficacy to current antidepressants such as the selective serotonin reuptake inhibitors (SSRIs).

References 

2-Aminoindanes
Entactogens and empathogens
Designer drugs
Phenol ethers
Serotonin releasing agents